The Chief of Corporate Staff (CCS) is a lieutenant general post in the South African National Defence Force

Role

The post of Chief of Corporate Staff was created in 2000. The post was first occupied by V Adm H.J.M. Trainor in late 2000. Chief of Corporate Staff reports to the Chief of the Defence Force and has equal standing as the arms of services. The restructuring after the Defence Review of 1998 paved way for changes in the SANDF, among others being the closing down of the Personnel Division and its functions were transferred to the Joint Support Division. The Chief of Corporate Staff consists of the Strategy and Planning Office, Religious Services, Defence Communications, Defence Reserves and Defence Legal Dept.

Past appointments

Chief of Corporate Staff
 V Adm Martyn Trainor 
 Lt Gen Themba Matanzima 
 Lt Gen (Dr) Jurinus Janse van Rensburg 
 Lt Gen (Dr) Vejaynand Ramlakan 
 Lt Gen Vusumuzi Masondo

Chief of Staff, SANDF

In 2017, the designation was changed during Lt Gen Masondo's tenure to that of simply Chief of Staff. 

 Lt Gen Vusumuzi Masondo 
 Lt Gen Lindile Yam 
 Lt Gen Michael Ramantswana

See also

Chief of Defence Force Staff

References

Military of South Africa